This list of prehistoric sites in Colorado includes historical and archaeological sites of humans from their earliest times in Colorado to just before the Colorado historic period, which ranges from about 12,000 BC to AD 19th century.  The Period is defined by the culture enjoyed at the time, from the earliest hunter-gatherers, the Paleo-Indians, through to the prehistoric parents to the modern Native Americans.

There were more than 56,500 recorded prehistoric sites in Colorado by 1996.  Important historic and archaeological sites are registered nationally with the National Register of Historic Places (National register) and within the state's Colorado State Register of Historic Properties (State register).  Most of the sites below are registered in one more both registers and was the source for most of the information for this section:


Prehistoric sites in Colorado

See also

Colorado
Bibliography of Colorado
Index of Colorado-related articles
Outline of Colorado
Colorado statistical areas
Geography of Colorado
History of Colorado
List of counties in Colorado
List of places in Colorado
List of mountain passes in Colorado
List of mountain peaks of Colorado
List of mountain ranges of Colorado
List of populated places in Colorado
List of census-designated places in Colorado
List of county seats in Colorado
List of forts in Colorado
List of ghost towns in Colorado
List of historic places in Colorado
List of municipalities in Colorado
List of post offices in Colorado
List of rivers of Colorado
List of protected areas of Colorado

References

External links

Colorado state government website
History Colorado website
Office of the State Archaeologist

Colorado geography-related lists
Colorado history-related lists
Protected areas of Colorado
Colorado, List of prehistoric sites in